Bedford High School is a public high school in the town of Bedford, Massachusetts, United States. It is operated under the authority of the Bedford Public Schools district. Students come primarily from Bedford. Other students that attend Bedford High School come from the neighboring Hanscom Air Force Base or from Boston through the use of the METCO system. Some Bedford students attend Shawsheen Valley Technical High School.

Academic information
Out of 141 public high schools in Massachusetts, a 2008 issue of Boston Magazine rated Bedford High as fourth place for overall "Cost Effectiveness" and fourteenth for academic performance statewide. In 2009, the magazine ranked Bedford High the 10th best overall public high school in Massachusetts.  In 2010, the magazine ranked BHS the 6th best overall public high school in Massachusetts.

A comprehensive, four-year school, Bedford High is accredited by the New England Association of Schools and Colleges
(N.E.A.S.C.). Enrollment is growing and was at 785 with a senior class of 183 for the 2020-2021 school year.

The student-faculty ratio is 16:1, and 76% of the faculty holds an advanced degree. The Class of 2009 MCAS passing rate on the first attempt was 100% for English and 100% for math.

School demographics

Notable alumni

 Doug Ardito, guitarist and bassist for rock band Puddle of Mudd
 Doug Coombs, alpine skier and mountaineer
 John Ferrillo, Principal Oboe, Boston Symphony Orchestra, former co-principal oboe of the Metropolitan Opera Orchestra in New York
 Steve Shea, former MLB player (Houston Astros, Montreal Expos)
 Taecyeon, actor, model and member of Korean idol group 2PM

References

External links
 
 City-data.com School Rating

Schools in Middlesex County, Massachusetts
Public high schools in Massachusetts